American rapper Fetty Wap has released two studio albums, two extended plays, eleven mixtapes, 68 singles (including twenty-eight as a featured artist), and six promotional singles.

Albums

Studio albums

Compilation albums

Mixtapes

EPs

Singles

As lead artist

As featured artist

Promotional singles

Other charted songs

Guest appearances

Notes

References 

Discographies of American artists
Hip hop discographies